Incorporeality is "the state or quality of being incorporeal or bodiless; immateriality; incorporealism." Incorporeal (Greek: ἀσώματος) means "Not composed of matter; having no material existence."

Incorporeality is a quality of souls, spirits, and God in many religions, including the currently major denominations and schools of Islam, Christianity and Judaism. In ancient philosophy, any attenuated "thin" matter such as air, aether, fire or light was considered incorporeal. The ancient Greeks believed air, as opposed to solid earth, to be incorporeal, in so far as it is less resistant to movement; and the ancient Persians believed fire to be incorporeal in that every soul was said to be produced from it. In modern philosophy, a distinction between the incorporeal and immaterial is not necessarily maintained: a body is described as incorporeal if it is not made out of matter.

In the problem of universals, universals are separable from any particular embodiment in one sense, while in another, they seem inherent nonetheless. Aristotle offered a hylomorphic account of abstraction in contrast to Plato's world of Forms. Aristotle used the Greek terms soma (body) and hyle (matter, literally "wood").

The notion that a causally effective incorporeal body is even coherent requires the belief that something can affect what's material, without physically existing at the point of effect. A ball can directly affect another ball by coming in direct contact with it, and is visible because it reflects the light that directly reaches it. An incorporeal field of influence, or immaterial body could not perform these functions because they have no physical construction with which to perform these functions. Following Newton, it became customary to accept action at a distance as brute fact, and to overlook the philosophical problems involved in so doing.

Philosophy

Pre-Socratic 
On Empedocles pre-socratic and incorporeal, Burnet writes:

On Anaxagoras and incorporeal, Burnet writes:

On the whole of ancient philosophy and incorporeal, Zeller writes:

Aristotelian 
Flannery in A Companion to Philosophy of Religion writes:

Platonic 
Renehan (1980) writes:

In chapter 10 of De ratione animae, Alcuin defines anima (soul) by combining Platonic attributes, including intellect and reason, ceaseless motion and immortality with the Christian tenents of free will and salvation. As a means of interaction with corporeals such as the human body and incorporeals such as God and the Forms, his definition includes traits pertaining to the soul as an incarnate entity within the natural world.

Theology

Church of Jesus Christ of Latter-day Saints 

Members of the Church of Jesus Christ of Latter-day Saints (see also Mormonism) view the mainstream Christian belief in God's incorporeality as being founded upon a post-Apostolic departure from what they claim is the traditional Judeo-Christian belief: an anthropomorphic, corporeal God. Mainstream Christianity has always interpreted anthropomorphic references to God in Scripture as non-literal, poetic, and symbolic.

See also

References 

Attributes of God in Christian theology
Concepts in ancient Greek metaphysics
Concepts in metaphysics
Dualism in cosmology
Platonism
Spiritualism
Supernatural legends